Pseudoludia suavis is a species of moth in the family Saturniidae. It was described by Rothschild in 1907. It is found in Tanzania and Malawi.

References

Moths described in 1907
Saturniinae
Insects of Tanzania
Moths of Africa